This is a short list of active and extinct volcanoes in Kenya.

List of volcanoes in Kenya (non-exhaustive)

References 

 Volcanoes of Kenya Volcano Alive, Retrieved on 2 November 2007

Kenya
 
Volcanoes